Ignacio Óscar Don Núñez (born 28 February 1982), also known as Nacho Don, is an Argentine-Paraguayan footballer that currently plays for Paraguayan Primera División club Club Guaraní as goalkeeper.

Don began his career at Paraguayan club Nacional in January 2005, aged 22. After two season in that club, in 2007, he moved to Chilean Primera División team Huachipato, directed by his countrymen Antonio Zaracho during that season, because he replaced to Arturo Salah in the bench, because he was signed by Chilean powerhouse Universidad de Chile. He had a six-months spell in Chile, playing 17 league games, but Don finished as the second-choice goalkeeper Cristián Torralbo.

After an unnoticed pass at Huachipato, he returned to Nacional for the 2008 season, team in where the following season, Don played the 2009 Copa Libertadores, his first international tournament, because the club's successful season. The following season, he won the Primera División title and again won the same title in the 2011 season.

Honours

Club
Nacional
 Paraguayan Primera División (2): 2009, 2011

External links
 
 

1982 births
Living people
Argentine footballers
Argentine expatriate footballers
Paraguayan Primera División players
Club Nacional footballers
Club Rubio Ñu footballers
Chilean Primera División players
C.D. Huachipato footballers
Expatriate footballers in Chile
Expatriate footballers in Paraguay
Association football goalkeepers
Sportspeople from Santiago del Estero Province